The Ilocanos (/), Ilokanos, or Iloko people are the third largest Filipino ethnolinguistic group.  They mostly reside within the Ilocos Region, in the northwestern seaboard of Luzon, Philippines. The native language of the Ilocano people is the Ilocano (or Ilokano) language.

Historically, the Ilocano people have developed a near-stereotypical reputation among Filipinos of resourcefulness, frugality and industriousness, their resilience likely stemming from their geographical location and extreme weather patterns, and their high average savings rate in the Ilocos Region throughout the 18-1900s. Ilocanos have an elaborate network of beliefs and social practices.

The Ilocano diaspora has reached nearly all parts of the Philippines, as well as places in the Western world, particularly Hawaii and California. Emigration was caused by dense population pressures in a region with limited agricultural potential. The Ilocos Region is one of the most densely populated regions in the country. Agricultural production is not sufficient to meet local needs, thus, much of the population historically went into the labor market and interregional trade. Tobacco is the leading cash crop of the Ilocano people. The textile industry in the area has a long tradition, while fishing is second only to agricultural production.

Among the more dominant of the ethnic groups, Ilocanos have figured prominently in the political, educational, economic, religious, and other sectors of Philippine society. Intensely regionalistic like most of the other major groups, the Ilocano people generally take pride in their roots and language.

Etymology

Alternatively, according to some records, the name term is derived from "l-"(originating from) and "luku" or "lukung (a valley or depression of land, hence "lowland"). It is located between the "gulod" (mountains) and the "luek" (sea or bay). Iloc"ano" is the Spanish word for "us" ano, which refers to the people (e.g., americano, italiano, africano, mexicano, etc.). Males are referred to as Ilocano or Ilokano while females are referred to as Ilocana or Ilokana.

History

Pre-history

Two theories are prominent among historians regarding the spread of what historians call the Austronesian peoples.
 A theory posted by the anthropologist Henry Otley Beyer, known as the Wave of Migration Theory, posits that from 300 to 200 BC a migration of Austronesian speaking people from the island of Borneo arrived on the shores of northwest Luzon. They were supposedly the most recent of the three waves of migration to the Philippines known as the Malays. Before the arrival of these people, the inhabitants of northwest Luzon were a different Austronesian-speaking people called the proto-Malay group, consisting of the modern Tinguian, Isneg, Kalinga, Kankanaey, Bontoc and other tribes collectively known today as the Igorot. Prior to the arrival of the Igorot, the people known today as the Aeta or Negritos resided in the area. Different studies show that the Ilocanos came to northwestern Luzon along with the Kalingas, Apayaos, and Tingguians. Over time, the Malay people intermarried with the proto-Malay and/or Aeta people, and it were their descendants (who lived along the coasts of northwestern Luzon) that the Spanish first came in contact with and called Ilocanos.
 Nowadays, the most commonly accepted theory is the "Out of Taiwan" model. In this model, it is suggested that the ancestors of today's Austronesian peoples originated from migrations from the island of Taiwan during the Neolithic period.

Early history

Social structure
While the Spanish applied the term barangay to the settlements in the Ilocos region upon contact, the Ilocano people called their towns íli and a smaller group of houses purók.

These residents of the íli were organized in a class society. At the top of the class system was a chief or agtúray or ári and his family. The ári earned his position due to strength, wealth or wisdom. This position could also be inherited and usually reserved for a male; however, in the event that no male heir was available, a strong female heir was accepted.

If the heir was found to be weak by the íli, then another ári family would be put in place and the former ári family could fall down in class. Together with a community of elders called amáen or panglakáyen íli, the ári administered justice and governed the daily lives of the íli and led his or her people to war if necessary.

Below the ári were the wealthy babaknáng, or maharlika in Tagalog, some of whom could easily move into the position of ári. Their wealth was maintained by their control of trade with primarily the Chinese, Japanese, Igorots, and the Tagalogs. Goods often traded were rice, cotton, gold, wax, iron, glass beads, honey, and stoneware jars called burnáy.

Below the babaknáng were the kailianes, a class that helped the ári in sailing, working his or her fields, and preparing for celebrations. In exchange, the kailianes were given gifts directly from the ári.

The katalonan were below the babaknáng and the kailianes and they were tenant farmers who consisted of the majority of the population in an íli. They largely practiced wet-rice agriculture which included rice and taro as well as dry agriculture that included cotton.

At the bottom of the pre-colonial Ilocano society were the ubíng and below them, the tagábu, also called adípen. The ubíng were servants while the tagábu were slaves. The tagábu acquired their status through unresolved debt, insulting a member of the babaknáng or ári, by being prisoners of war, or even inheriting the debt of their ancestor.

Clothing and appearances
At the time of the Spanish conquest, the Ilocanos had long hair like the Igorots, but it was not as long as the Cagayanons’ (Ibanag and Itawes) whose hair covered their backs. Women wore their hair in a charming bun on the crown of their heads. Both men and women took care of their hair, using shampoo decoctions made from the barks of specific trees, coconut oil mixed with musk and other perfumes, gogo, and lye made from rice husk, which is still used in Ilocos today.

They polished and sharpened their teeth with betel nut husk and stones since childhood, making them all even or sometimes serrated like saw teeth. They would color them red or black, just like the Igorots, to preserve them. The wealthy, particularly women, decorated or encrusted them with gold to make them more powerful or flashy.

Men entertained themselves by pulling the hairs out of their beards using clam shells fashioned into tweezers; that is why they did not have beards and mustaches like they do today.

Women, and men in some places, adorned their ears with large gold rings, and children had their earlobes pierced. The more ripped and larger the holes, the higher the social status. There were two types of ear piercings: one for a small earflap and one for a larger earflap. The preceding was written by a chronicler about Filipinos in general. Thus, according to Isabelo de los Reyes, old Ilocano women did not wear earrings, whereas today's women consider them a sign of coquetery. Although the old Ilocano men do not recall their ancestors wearing earrings, it is highly likely that they did so in imitation of their Igorot neighbors.

The men wore a long narrow cloth called “bangal” (Tagalogs called them “potong”) that they wrapped around their heads like Tinguians or fashioned into a Muslim-style turban. Those who were proud of their bravery draped the bangal over their shoulder, the embroidered ends touching the back of their knees. The bangal's colors represented the wearer's accomplishments and status: red indicated that the wearer had killed someone; only those who had killed seven or more could wear a striped bangal. However, by the time of Morga, thirty years after the Spanish conquest, men were already wearing hats.

In addition to the bangal, farmers and fishermen also wore a gourd hat called a kattukong on sunny or rainy days. The kattukong was made from a hollowed and dried calabash gourd (tabúngaw in Ilocano) with a woven interior made of anahaw, nipa, bamboo, or rattan. Also often worn during rainy days was a cape called a annangá, also called lábig or kalapiáw, which was often made of nipa palm leaves.

Men wore a collarless waist-length fitted jacket made of cloth that was sewn in front, similar to the Tinguians' koton. It had short, wide blue or black sleeves. The principalia had them in fine red chininas crepe from India or silk.

For trousers, Ilocanos wore a richly colored cloth, usually gold striped, rolled up at the waist, and passing between the legs such that they were decently covered until mid-thigh; from the thigh down, their legs and feet remained uncovered. Ilocanos called them babaques, according to the author of Lavor Evangelica (Evangelical Labor); Morga corroborates the observation.

In the 21st century, Ilocano women have followed suit when wearing traditional dress, gathering up the skirt in front, passing it between their legs and hitching it at the back of their waist, "thereby covering until their mid-thigh and leaving the rest down to their legs and feet uncovered."

Ilocanos' main accessories were precious stones, gold jewelry, and expensive trinkets. According to Morga, the Ilocano men wore many gold chains around their necks, “fashioned like spun gold and linked in the same style as ours”. Gold and ivory kalombiga bracelets were wrapped around their arms from hand to elbow, and some wore strings of carnelian, agate, and other blue and white stones.

Ilocanos also wore anklets or strings made of the same stones, as well as many black-dyed strings. According to Morga, they used to walk around barefoot, but after the Spaniards arrived, they began wearing shoes. Many of the women were dressed in gold-embroidered velvet slippers. They wore stone and gold rings on their fingers. They wore a sash, which was a rich shawl draped over the shoulder and tied beneath the arm.

The women wore a multicolored overskirt over a floor-length white underskirt that was usually as wide on top as it was on the bottom.

The pleats were paced at one side after it was gathered at the waist. In Ilocos, where it is still used today, the pleats are called “salupingping”.

Ladies of the principalia wore crimson silk or other cloth woven with gold and decorated with thick fringes whenever they went out. Morga and Father Colin speak for Filipinos in general. During ceremonies, the principalia and others wore a black, floor-length cloak with long sleeves over their clothes; the old ladies also wore them. This style of clothing would eventually replace the Ilocano women's gleaming black shawl.

Women wore gold and precious stone jewelry on their ears, wrists, fingers, and neck. The Ilocanos would prick themselves, then rub the area with permanent black pitch powder or smoke; they did not do it as commonly as the Visayans, who painted themselves as a matter of course.

“In time the practice became more popular and dividing society into different classes brought with it some requirements; the Indio principalia showed off their bedaubed clothing while the comm man of the people was naked,” wrote Morga y Jimenez.

Indeed, the Ilocanos must have been naked in the beginning with only a small loincloth of smoothened balete like the Igorots of Abra, and they most probably only started wearing clothes when the Asians brought over cloth from their own countries which they have used since then to exploit the wealth of this country.

However, when the Spaniards arrived, the rich wore clothing that, according to all the chronicles, was luxurious and in good taste.

Spanish Era to the Philippine Republic

Juan de Salcedo
The Spanish conquistador Juan de Salcedo explored the northern regions of the Philippines in 1571, where he traveled to the Ilocos region (among other places), colonizing the north, and establishing several Spanish municipalities, including Villa Fernandina (present-day Vigan) and Tagudin.

War with Zambales and Pangasinan 1660
In 1660, Andres Malong, a chief of San Carlos, Pangasinan or Binalatongan as it was called then, allied with the people of Zambales in an effort to remove the Spanish and subdue those who supported Spain. Malong was formerly employed by the Spanish to help colonize non-Christian towns and villages in Pangasinan, however, as Malong subjugated others, he realized he could also overcome the outnumbered Spanish.

With his Zambales allies, Malong crowned himself the king of Pangasinan and sent out letters to all the chiefs of the Ilocos Region, Pampanga and Cagayan Valley and demanded that they too align and recognize Malong as their king and kill any Spaniards among them. If they did not, Malong warned that he would invade and punish them for not joining his cause.

Unlike Pangasinan and the Zambales, The Ilocos at the time was a region that the Spanish invested its soldiers and missionaries in and routinely secured. Towns such as Vigan, Ilocos Sur and Tagudin, Ilocos Sur were quickly conquered by the Spanish encomiendas, fortifications and Catholic churches quickly established to subjugate the Ilocano people into the Spanish Empire. The Spanish were swift in this process to stake their claim on the region's gold trade with the Igorots. They sought to prevent Chinese and Japanese pirates and different European powers such as the Dutch or English from taking these trade routes. Considering this relatively recent history with the Spanish and primarily under the influence of Catholic missionaries, many of the Ilocano chiefs rejected Andres Malong's offer.

In response to their rejection, Malong sent a Zambales chief named Don Pedro Gumapos, who had recently conquered the Pampanga region with 6,000 men, to invade the Ilocos as well as Cagayan regions. Gumapos and his men were met with only 1,500 Spanish loyalist Ilocanos under the command of the alcalde mayor of the region and even missionaries. As such, the Zambales and Pangasinese army quickly defeated them and marched as far north as Vigan, Ilocos Sur where they sacked and burned the Spanish stronghold and nearby villages. With many of the Spanish missionaries and colonial authorities in Ilocos evacuated or in retreat, Malong then asked Gumapos to assist him in Pangasinan, where the Spanish were beginning to advance on him. As Gumapos and his troops traveled back down through Narvacan, Ilocos Sur, they continued to raid Ilocano towns and villages for supplies. Ultimately, the people of Narvacan responded with guerrilla tactics aided by their Tinguian allies. This retaliation by the Ilocano people was devastating and caused more fatalities on Gumapos' army than with the Spanish lead Ilocano forces.

As the invading army headed south, they sacked and/or burned the coastal towns of Santa Maria, Ilocos Sur, San Esteban, Ilocos Sur, Santiago, Ilocos Sur and Candon, Ilocos Sur. When they finally approached Santa Cruz, Ilocos Sur, Gumapos encountered a Spanish led army who had just finished reconquering Pangasinan and captured Andres Malong. Despite learning of Malong's defeat, Gumapos led his army to battle. Gumapos and his army were defeated after two large battles. After being captured, Gumapos was sent back to Vigan, Ilocos Sur where he was executed by hanging. The Ilocos Region would not see another revolt against the Spanish until 1762.

The Basi Revolt 1807 
The Basi Revolt, also known as the Ambaristo Revolt, erupted on September 16, 1807, in the present-day town of Piddig, Ilocos Norte. Led by Pedro Mateo, a cabeza de barangay of Piddig, and Saralogo Ambaristo, an Ilocano and Tinguian, and composed of townspeople from Piddig, Badoc, Sarrat, Laoag, Sinait, Cabugao, Magsingal and other towns of Ilocos, they marched under their own flag of yellow and red horizontal bands and made their way southward towards the provincial capital of Vigan to protest against the abuses of the Spanish colonial government.

According to historical accounts, in 1786, people's frustration grew over the basi (the local beverage of the Ilocos) wine monopoly imposed by the Spanish colonial government that prohibited the private manufacture of basi, forcing Ilocanos to buy from government stores.

Even before the arrival of the Spaniards, basi was an important part of the Ilocanos' society and culture. Drinking basi played such a great importance in Ilocano culture; from marriage to childbirth and to death, it was a part of their ritual, tradition, and daily life. Basi was a major industry in the Ilocos region at the time, therefore in addition to the grief of Ilocanos had also lost their livelihood, in other words, they had been robbed of their happiness as well as an essential part of their culture and heritage.

Fueled by these abuses, people were prompted to start the uprising in Piddig town and later spread in the northern and southern towns of Ilocos province. On September 28, 1807, Ilocano forces on their way to the capital Vigan were assassinated by Spanish forces while crossing the Bantaoay River in San Ildefonso, Ilocos Sur, resulting in the deaths of hundreds of Ilocano forces. Those who survived the battle were hanged and their heads pierced with wooden poles and flagged by the Spaniards as a warning to anyone who wanted to strike and fight against the Spaniards.

The Basi Revolt lasted for 13 days. The period of unrest also led the colonial government to divide the province into the now Ilocos Norte and Ilocos Sur. Despite failing to attain their ultimate goal of liberation, the Basi Revolt succeeded in inspiring future movements for justice and freedom in northern Luzon.

American Colonial Era and World War II 
In 1901, the region came under American colonial rule, and in 1941, under Japanese occupation.

During 1945, the combined American and the Philippine Commonwealth troops including with the Ilocano and Pangasinan guerillas liberated the Ilocos Region from Japanese forces during the Second World War.

Modern history

Post-Independence period 
Several modern presidents of the Republic of the Philippines hailed from the Region: Elpidio Quirino, Ferdinand Marcos. Marcos expanded the scope of the original Ilocos Region by transferring the province of Pangasinan from Region III into Region I in 1973, and imposed a migration policy for Ilokanos into Pangasinan; He also expanded Ilokano influence amongst the ethnic peoples of the Cordilleras by including Abra, Mountain Province, and Benguet in the Ilocos region in 1973, although these were later integrated into the Cordillera Administrative Region in 1987. A third "Ilocano" President, Fidel V. Ramos, hailed from Pangasinan.

Martial Law era 

Ilocanos were also among the victims of human rights violations during the martial law era which began in September 1972, despite public perception that the region was supportive of Marcos' administration. In Ilocos Norte, various farmers from the towns of Vintar, Dumalneg, Solsona, Marcos and Piddig were documented to have been tortured, and eight farmers in Bangui and three indigenous community members in Vintar were "salvaged" in 1984.

Ilocanos who were critical of Marcos' authoritarian rule included Roman Catholic Archbishop and Agoo, La Union native Antonio L. Mabutas, who spoke actively against the torture and killings of church workers. Another prominent opponent of the martial law regime was human rights advocate and Bombo Radyo Laoag program host David Bueno, who worked with the Free Legal Assistance Group in Ilocos Norte during the later part of the Marcos administration and the early part of the succeeding Aquino administration. Bueno was assassinated by motorcycle-riding men in fatigue uniforms on October 22, 1987 – part of a wave of assassinations which coincided with the 1986–87 coup d'etat which tried to unseat the democratic government set up after the 1986 People Power Revolution.

Others critics included student activists Romulo and Armando Palabay of San Fernando, La Union, who were tortured and killed in a Military camp in Pampanga; and Purificacion Pedro, a Catholic lay social worker who tried to help the indigenous peoples in the resistance against the Chico River Dam Project, was caught in the crossfire of a military operation, and was later murdered in the hospital by a soldier who claimed she was a rebel sympathizer.

Bueno, Pedro, and the Palabay brothers would later be honored as martyrs of the fight against the dictatorship at the Philippines' Bantayog ng mga Bayani memorial.

Recent cultural work 
A number of major initiatives to promote Ilocano culture have been initiated since the late 1990s.

The historic town of Vigan was inscribed on the World Heritage List in 1999, and the local community effort to preserved it has since been recognized as "a model of best practices in World Heritage site management."

In international ethnic studies, University of California, Davis professor Robyn Rodriguez founded the Bulosan Center for Filipino Studies, named after the Binalonan-born author Carlos Bulosan.

Ilocano entrepreneurs such as Niña Corpuz have revived the popularity of Inabel fabrics by incorporating it into high fashion, creating a new demand for the material.

Demographics 

Ilocanos number 8,074,536 in the Philippines in 2010. A few Ilocanos living in the Cordilleras have some Cordillerano blood.

Ethnic Homeland
Ilocandia or Kailokuan / Kailukuan is the term given to the traditional homeland of the Ilocano people, which constitutes present-day Ilocos Norte and the northern portions of Ilocos Sur, hence in early history and early Ilocano inhabitants of the region called their place as Samtoy, from “sao mi toy,” which literally means "our language here".

Diaspora 
The mounting population pressure due to the substantial population density during the mid-19th century caused the migration of the Ilocanos out of their traditional homeland. By 1903, more than 290,000 Ilocanos migrated to Central Luzon, Cagayan Valley, and Metro Manila. More than 180,000 moved to the provinces of Pangasinan, Tarlac, and Nueva Ecija; there is a visible Ilocano population in Aurora and in Quezon Province when the 2 provinces were one and part of Southern Tagalog, the concentration of Ilocano population in the present Southern Tagalog and Calabarzon is now Quezon Province. Almost 50,000 moved to Cagayan Valley; half of them resided in Isabela. Around 47,000 lived in Zambales and more than 11,000 in Sultan Kudarat.

Later migrations brought Ilocanos to the Cordilleras, Mindoro, Palawan, and Mindanao provinces of Sultan Kudarat, North Cotabato, and South Cotabato.

The Ilocano diaspora continued in 1906 when Ilocanos started to migrate to Hawaii and California. They are called the manongs or sakadas, the first generation of Filipino immigrants to the United States of America, primarily in California and Hawaii. In Ilocano, the term manong is loosely used to refer to an elderly gentleman. Sakadas "imported ones" "lower-paid workers recruited out of the area" and a term for "migrant workers" in and from the Philippines, doing manual agricultural labor. Within the Philippines, sakadas work in provinces other than their own. In the 20th century, Filipino men were imported by the Hawaiian Sugar Planters' Association to work in the sugarcane and pineapple fields to Hawaii as skilled laborers from 1906 to 1946 mainly from the Ilocos region of the Philippines to seek their fate, or gasat in Iloco, for a better life for themselves and their families.

The Hawaiian Sugar Planters' Association approved a plan to recruit labor from the Philippines in April 1906 and asked Albert F. Judd to represent them. The first Filipino farm laborers in Hawaii arrived in December 1906 from Candon, Ilocos Sur, aboard the SS Doric (1883).

Ilocanos composed the largest number of expatriates in the United States, though most are bilingual with Tagalog. There is a significant Ilocano community in Hawai'i, in which they make up more than 85% of the Filipino population there.

Languages

Most Ilocanos speak the Ilocano language, which is part of the Northern Philippine subgroup of the Austronesian family of languages. They also speak Tagalog, and English as second languages.

Ilocano, like all Philippine languages, is an Austronesian language, it is related to Malay (Indonesian and Malaysian), Tetum, Chamorro, Fijian, Māori, Hawaiian, Samoan, Tahitian, Paiwan, and Malagasy. It is closely related to some of the other Austronesian languages of Northern Luzon, and has slight mutual intelligibility with the Balangao language and the eastern dialects of the Bontoc language.

Austronesian is a very expansive language family believed to originate in Taiwan. Ilocano comprises its own branch within the Philippine Cordilleran language subfamily. It is spoken as first language by seven million people.

A lingua franca of the northern region (Northern Luzon and northern areas of Central Luzon) of the Philippines, it is spoken as a secondary language by more than two million people who are native speakers of Ibanag, Ivatan, Ibaloi, Itneg, Itawes, Pangasinan, Kankanaey, Kalinga, and other languages in Northern Luzon. Many Ilocanos speak those languages in North Luzon.

Religion
Most Ilocanos are Roman Catholics, though some are members of the Aglipayan Church, which originated in Ilocos Norte.

Indigenous beliefs

Cosmology 
In Ilocano cosmology, there is the concept of the upstream “surong” and downstream “puyupoyan”, among 3 other cosmological regions. Surong represented creation, birth, and life and puyupoyan represented the death and the afterlife. They would give atang, or food offerings, that were put on a raft and drifted downstream as an offering to the spirits.

Throughout several ethnic groups the Milky Way was seen as something connected with water. For the Ilocano people, they called the Milky Way as “Rimmuok dagiti Bitbituen”. They saw it as a river in the night sky.

Spirits 
Prior to the arrival of the Spanish, Ilocanos were animists who believed in spirits called anito, who were either bad or good. The anito ruled over all aspects of the universe. For example, litao were the anitos of water; kaibáan, also called kanibáan, were anitos of the undergrowth in a forest; and mangmangkik were anitos of trees. The mangmangkik were often feared for causing sickness when a fellow tree was cut down. To appease the mangmangkik before cutting down a tree, the following chant was made:

Bari Bari.
Dikat agunget pari.
Ta pumukan kami.
Iti pabakirda kadakami.

This chant calls on the mangmangkik and beseeches them not to curse the people cutting the tree down. Similar chants and phrases are uttered to appease the kaibáan when hot cooking water is thrown out into the yard for disposal. The kaibáan can be befriended, giving luck and blessing to the person. Likewise, if a kaibáan is angered, illness and in some cases death would plague the person's health and family.

Other ways anitos were respected and appeased were through offerings and sacrifices to idols on platforms called a simbaan or designated caves where the anito frequents. These offerings, called atang, consisted of various foodstuffs and sweets, as well as cigars and paan.

Atang is also offered to the deceased during prayers for the dead or on Pista ti Natay, Undas or All Soul's Day. Plates of food prepared for an atang consist of delicacies such as suman, dudul, linapet, baduya, patopat or balisongsong (snacks made from sticky rice or rice flour); busi (caramelized popped rice); linga (black sesame seeds); sticky rice with coconut milk; and bagas (uncooked rice) shaped in a crucifix and topped with fresh eggs. The food may also be accompanied by bua ken gawed (betel nut and piper leaf), apog (lime powder), basi (fermented sugarcane wine), and tabako (tobacco). These offerings are placed in front of a photo of the departed and/or image of Jesus, Mary, or the Holy Family during wakes and anniversaries in homes or in front of the graves, after which the family and/or mourners of the deceased may also offer prayers.

Soul beliefs and typology 
Ilocanos generally believe that the soul has not yet left the world of the living during the wake and still needs sustenance, hence the offering of food as they transcend onto the afterlife. It is also believed that the soul returns to the land of the living after the nine-day wake and must be welcomed back. In instances when the deceased appears in a dream or when a family member suddenly experiences unexplainable sickness, atang is performed as an appeasement ritual for the deceased who may have been offended or disturbed. It is also interpreted as asking the deceased to intercede for their loved ones, and thanking them for warning against bad omen through dreams. The significance of the atang for the Ilocanos goes beyond the remembrance and honoring of the dead loved ones. It connotes their view of life after death and the relation of the living to the departed.

According to one Ilocano mythological tale, the sky was created by a giant named Aran, who hung the sun, moon, and stars in it. Aran's companion, the giant “Angalo”, could see the land under their light, which he then molded into mountains and valleys. The giants discovered their world to be windswept and desolate. Angalo spat on the ground, and the first man and woman emerged from his spit. He put them in a bamboo tube and tossed it into the sea. The bamboo washed up on the shores of the Ilocos region, and the Ilocano people descended from this couple.

Like other Filipinos, Ilocanos recognize an array of supernatural beings, such as the “katawtaw-an” (the spirits of infants, who died unbaptized who in turn victimize newborns).

The Ilocano traditional mythos has a four-soul system. 

 The first soul of the Ilocanos is called the “kararua” or the soul proper. This is the term used for the equivalent of the Christian soul that can only leave after death.
 Karkarma is the name of the second soul. It can leave the physical body when one is frightened, or may be stolen. If this soul fails to return the owner becomes insane, sacrificial ceremonies may be held to lure back a lost karkarma.  Karkarma stands for natural vigor, mind and reason.
 Aniwaas is the name of the third soul. It can leave the body during sleep and visits places familiar to the body. If one wakes up while the aniwaas is visiting these places, they may lose the aniwaas and become insane.
 Araria is the name of the fourth soul. This is the liberated soul of the dead, the soul that visits relatives and friends in the earthworld asking them to pray for it or perform a duty it failed to do in life. Its presence can be heralded by the howling of dogs, the cracking of glass, the rattling of beds, and the banging of doors, or in the form (at night) of a grunting pig or a crowing chicken. These signs remind the living to pray to God for the forgiveness of the deceased's sins (otherwise, the al-alia may visit misfortunes upon them). This soul can make sounds and manipulate physical objects usually relating to what it did in life.

Water beliefs 
A mantra in Ilocano religion is Water is life. It is death. In many ethnic groups in the Philippines, water represents a cosmological cycle of both. Water plays a vital role in Ilocano folklore, from the Ilocano god of the rivers and sea, Apo Litao, to cosmological beliefs involving the water and sea.

Apo Litao is the Ilocano god of the sea and rivers. It is said that Apo Litao is a small man who lives in the branches of the bamboo trees along the river banks. In one tale, there was once a girl who lived with her mother near the banks of the river. One day her sewing needle fell into the river and her mother warned her not to get it. However, she went anyway and once she got the needle, the waves swept her away. She was taken in by Apo Litao who gave her the gift of enchantment and she became his wife. She became a mermaid, or sirena and the queen of the waters. She is described to have long, thick hair and sharp nails. To those who speak ill of her, she would kill them. But to those who gained her favor, she used her gifts to entertain and give them gifts.

Water, especially the rivers, is seen by the majority of ethnic groups in the Philippines as pathways to the afterlife. There is a belief that the soul travels on a boat that is ferried by a deity or spirit. The most famous depiction of this concept is through the manunggul jar, that was found in a cave in Palawan. For the Ilocanos, this concept is also found. When the deceased was buried, they would give offerings and money in the coffin so that they would be able to pay the toll to the agrakrakit, the spirit who ferries the dead souls, so that they would be able to cross the waters to the afterlife safely.

Crocodiles were once abundant in the Philippines. They were deeply respected and historical records state that they were seen as divine creatures, even representing the ancestors and were called nono. They would give offerings (panagyatang) to them as signs of respect. Fishermen would throw the first catch to the crocodile.

Sibróng 
Another practice that survived well into the 19th century was sibróng, associated with human sacrifice and headhunting, sibróng was a prevalent practice in the Ilocos region. The person who carried out the executions was called the mannibróng; this term now means 'thief' in modern Ilocano. Before the death of a community leader or a member of the principalía, the dying person would lift his hand raised with a certain number of fingers. The number of fingers raised would be the indicator of how many people would have to be killed in order to accompany the dying to the afterlife. In other cases, the people chosen by the mannibróng would have their fingers cut off instead of being executed. Síbrong can also refer to the practice of placing a human head in the foundations of the building to protect the structure from damage.

Culture

Ilocandia boasts a vibrant culture that bears some resemblance back to colonial times. The colonial city of Vigan, sometimes known as the "Intramuros of the North", still has its original Castillan colonial architecture. Old Spanish-style dwellings (often known as bahay na bato or Vigan houses) line the small and cobblestoned streets. Enormous, high-pitched roofs, large and rectangular living rooms with life-sized mirrors, ancient, wooden furniture, and elegant Vienna sets characterize these majestic mansions.

The churches of the Ilocos region are a lasting emblem of the Ilocano's triumphant transformation from practitioners of local religions to believers in theistic Christianity. The Vigan Cathedral in Ilocos Sur, with its gigantic hand-carved pictures of the route crucis; the Magsingal Cathedral (also in Ilocos Sur), with its centuries-old wooden altar; the St. Augustine Church in Paoay (Ilocos Norte), with its massive buttresses; and Santa Maria Church (Ilocos Sur) is a UNESCO World Heritage Site that is located on a hill with an 80-step stone stairway.

Dances were mainly a reflection of the gracious ways of the Ilocano. The dinaklisan (a dance common to fisher folks), the agabel (a weaver's dance) and the agdamdamili (a pot dance) illustrate in simple steps the ways of the industrious Ilocano. Other popular dances among the Ilocanos are Tadek, Habanera, Comintan, Saimita, Kinotan, Kinnalogong.

Cuisine

Ilocanos boasts of a diet heavy in boiled or steamed vegetables and freshwater fish and are particularly fond of dishes flavored with bugguong (fermented fish paste). Most people are unaware that Ilocano cuisine arose out of necessity. Due to the severe conditions of the region, Ilocanos had no choice but to make do with what they had, including the bitterest bitter gourd. Ilocandia is known for its strong culinary traditions all around the country. It's an island-strewn, salt-loving, porcine-dominated regional cuisine known for its delectable dishes.

Prominent ingredients include sukang iloko (sugarcane vinegar), bugguong, bawang (garlic), and karne (meats) with a crispy finish.

Ilocanos often season boiled vegetables with bugguong monamon (fermented anchovy paste) to produce pinakbet, dinengdeng, inabraw, buridibod and many other local dishes. Local specialties include the abuos, soft white larvae of ants, and “jumping salad” or tiny live shrimp ipon with calamansi juice.

Dinakdakan, made from masskara or grilled pig's head parts and offal, blended with lasoná or sibuyas and pig's brain; Insarabasab, made out of chopped flame grilled pork mixed with chillies, lasoná or sibuyas (onion), sukang Iloko (vinegar) and other spices; Ilocos Empanada, an orange-tinged glutinous rice flour with atsuete fried dish stuffed with vegetables or green papaya, skinless longganisa, and egg; bagnet, a pork belly boiled and deep fried until it is crispy; chicharon; poqui poqui, made of eggplant, tomatoes, and eggs; igado, strips of meat, liver, and other internal organs such as kidney, heart, and intestines, this dish reflects the influence of the Spanish cuisine, from higado; pinapaitan (composed of cow or goat innards and bile); sinanglaw (beef innards, tendon, face and bile); and dinardaraan (dry pork blood stew) are another popular dish among Ilocanos and Filipinos.

Another food that is popular for many Ilocanos is marunggay. It is a condiment for meat soup called La'uya (e.g. tinola) or it can be mixed with the famous dinengdeng, a soup made of mainly vegetables with prawn aramang or armang. Most households grow this tree in their backyards and usually offered free for all the neighbors who may want them. Many Ilocanos from Hawaii are fond of eating them. The Ilocano people are also known to be the first ethnic group in the Philippines to eat the larvae and eggs of abuos (weaver ants). The practice has since been infused as well with other ethnic groups in northern Luzon.

Literature 
Ilocano animistic past offers a rich background in folklore, mythology and superstition (see Religion in the Philippines). There are many stories of good and malevolent spirits and beings. Its creation mythology centers on the giants Aran and her husband Angalo, and Namarsua ("the creator").

Pre-colonial Iloko literature were composed of folk songs, riddles, proverbs, lamentations called dung-aw, and epic stories in written or oral form. Ancient Ilokano poets expressed themselves in folk and war songs as well as the dallot, an improvised, versified and at times impromptu long poem delivered in a sing-song manner.

During the Spanish regime, Iloko poetry was generally patterned after Spanish models. In fact, the earliest known written Iloko poems were the romances translated from Spanish by Francisco Lopez, an Augustinian friar who, in 1621, published his own Iloko translation of the Doctrina Cristiana by Cardinal Bellarmine, the first book to be printed in Iloko.

A study of Iloko poetry could be found in the Gramatica Ilokana, published in 1895, based on Lopez's Arte de la Lengua Iloca, earlier published in 1627, but was probably written before 1606.

Some Iloko writers credit Pedro Bucaneg, who collaborated with Lopez in the translation of the Doctrina into Iloko, for having been the first known Ilokano poet, and as the "Father of Ilokano Poetry and Literature." Bucaneg, blind since childhood, authored the popular epic known as Biag ni Lam-ang ("Life of Lam-ang") written in the 17th century. One of the most well-known Ilocano literary works written in Iloco is the Biag ni Lam-Ang ("The Life of Lam-Ang"), an epic poem about the fantastic life and escapades of an Ilocano hero named Lam-ang. Biag ni Lam-ang is a testament in the Ilocano literature, It reflects values important to traditional Ilocano society; it is a hero's journey steeped in courage, loyalty, pragmatism, honor, and ancestral and familial bonds.

The earliest written form of the epic poem was given by Fr. Gerardo Blanco to Isabelo de los Reyes, who published it in El Ilocano from December 1889 to February 1890, with Spanish translation in prose, and also reprinted it in his El Folklore Filipino, under the title Vida de Lam-ang.

Ilocano literature developed in many ways. During the 18th century, the missionaries used religious as well as secular literatures among other means to advance their mission of converting the Ilokanos to Christianity. The century also saw the publication of religious works like Fr. Jacinto Rivera's Sumario de las Indulgencias de la Santa Correa in 1719 and the Pasion, a translation of St. Vincent Ferrer's sermons into Iloko by Fr. Antonio Mejia in 1845.

The 19th century likewise saw the appearance of Leona Florentino, who has since been considered by some as the "National Poetess of the Philippines". Her poems which have survived, however, appear to the modern reader as being too syrupy for comfort, too sentimental to the point of mawkishness, and utterly devoid of form.

The Ilocano writer Elizabeth Medina is probably the most remarkable living Ilocano writer in the Spanish language.

Numerous Ilocano writers have won national and international acclaim – among the most notable being early 20th century author and World War II guerilla hero Manuel Arguilla, whose prose was known for capturing the unique accent of Ilocano culture and the textures of the Ilocos region; Binalonan-born early 20th century writer and poet Carlos Bulosan, whose novel America is in the Heart has become regarded as "[t]he premier text of the Filipino-American experience"; and mid-19th century writer and activist Isabelo de los Reyes of Vigan who helped publish the earliest currently-extant text of Biag ni Lam-Ang.

Ilocano culture revolves around life rituals, festivities, and oral history. These were celebrated in songs (kankanta), dances (salsala), poems (dandaniw), riddles (burburtia), proverbs (pagsasao), literary verbal jousts called bucanegan (named after the writer Pedro Bucaneg, and is the equivalent of the Balagtasan of the Tagalogs), and epic stories.

Music and performing arts

Kankanta / Kansion (folk songs) 
Ilocano folk songs are all about the natural world, home and family, friendship or love, worksongs, and nonsense songs. Other songs address issues such as love, marriage, death, kinship, religion, and politics. Regarding the virtues reflected in the folksongs, the Ilocanos' characteristics are reflected in these folksongs. The Ilocano character and culture are simple in life, heart, and taste, humble, religious, industrious, and thrifty.

Pamulinawen is a popular old Ilocano folk song possibly from the pre-Spanish era, It is about a girl with a hardened heart, who does not need her lover's pleading, It is about courtship and love; Manang Biday This song implies the courtship of a young maiden named Manang Biday. Serenading a love interest is a custom of the Filipinos; O Naraniag A Bulan literally means “O Bright / Shiny Moon” is a paradox because the girl who is singing is sad; her love story is very sad. If she doesn't get some enlightenment soon, she is now contemplating suicide ("samsam-itek ni Patay") and yet the music has a fast beat and it is uplifting; Ti Ayat Ti Maysa A Ubing Is an Ilocano folk song which means “love of a child” which depicts the love of a child is pure, unbiased, and untapped; Bannatiran refers to the bannatiran bird that is supposedly native to the Ilocos region on the island of Luzon in the Philippines, this song was composed by a Don Claro for a Señorita Valentina (late of Laoag, Ilocos Norte), basically referring to her as a “bannatiran” because of her highly sought after kayumanggi (brown)  complexion; Dungdungwen Kanto (Lullaby of Love) an Ilocano love / wedding song and it's also sung as a lullaby; Osi-osi this folksong portrays the traditional ways of courtship; Ayat ti Ina (Love of a Mother) is a song that expresses how a mother loves and takes care of her child; Napateg A Bin-I (Cherished Seed) this song basically uses metaphors comparing a woman to a seed; Duayya ni Ayat (Love’s Lullaby) is a song that expresses a man’s love for his lady. The man asks the lady to be careful in changing her mind and choosing another man; Siasin ti Agayat Kenka (Who is in love with you?) this song expresses an insistent love; No Duaduaem Pay (If You Still Doing) this is an folksong that gives the idea that the lover feels that his loved one doubts him. The man asks the lady to understand him and convince her to believe that his love is true; Teng-Nga Ti Rabii (Midnight) is a song that tells a lover who sees the image of his loved one in the middle of the night and is awakened by her voice; Dinak Kad Dildilawen (Do Not Criticize Me) is an Ilocano song that expresses patriotism. This song conveys service to love of country; Kasasaad ti Kinabalasang (The life of a Maiden) is an advice for the young maidens to consider carefully their plans of getting married.

Salsala (folk dances) 
Ilocano folk dances reflect the humble, religious, lively, hardworking, and thrifty way of life and history of the Ilocano people. Ilocano dances are form part of Ilocano expression and most importantly, values and consciousness. Ilocano folk dances are fuselage of infinite cultural elements that constitute the vast and dynamic social, political, economic, artistic, and religious landscapes of Ilocandia.

The “kumintang” step is one example. There are kumintang steps in other parts of the Philippines, however Ilocano kumintang is done inwards and with a half-closed hand, but not too closed like a hand feast. Through the kumintang, we may demonstrate and internalize the fact that Ilocanos save for the future.

The “korriti” step demonstrates that Ilocanos are lively, hardworking, and fast on their feet. That's why Ilocanos work on vast farmlands, and also search for place where can earn living.

The “sagamantika” step is a dance with soft gestures. It is a forward and backward movement. It portrays Ilocano saying that even if you leave, you will always return to your origin since this is where you were born, this is where you experienced love, and this is where you lived for a long time.

Ilocano folk dances are composed of courtship dances, occupational dances, ritual dances, celebration dances and others with heavily influences by Cordilleran (Igorot), Spanish, American etc. dance steps.

Here are some Ilocano folk dances:

Ilocana A Nasudi (Chaste Ilocano / The Lovely Ilocana) — it is a dance that portrays a chaste and virtuous Ilocana. This dance may be performed by four pairs and depiction of the beauty, modesty, and grace of the Ilokana. Originally, this dance was accompanied by a kutibeng, a five-stringed instrument, and as was practiced by the settlers of Barrio Naglayaan, Dingras; Binigan-Bigat (Every Morning) — is a courtship dance that narrates the story of a boy who is in love with a girl from whom he asks pity; Dinaklisan — a dance common to fisher folks originated from Currimao, a town where fishing is the chief industry. It is also an Ilocano term with the variety, agdaklis, meaning to fish with the use of a net. It has been a testament to hard work, resilience, and endurance that is espoused by the town’s fisherfolks; Sileledda-Ang (Grief-stricken or Laden with Sorrow) — a courtship dance showing the lover’s fondness for each other; Sabunganay (Banana Blossom) — it symbolizes a young lady who is still too young to be courted; Binatbatan — is an occupational dance. The dance depicts the beating of cotton pods to separate the seeds from the fibers with the use of two sticks called “batbat”. To process the raw material used in weaving, ginne cotton was beaten with a pair of sticks sounding a clear and distinct rhythm on a carabao hide to separate fiber strands. The people of Paoay are known for their fabled skill in weaving a heritage cloth called abel; Pandanggo Laoagueña — it is a courtship dance performed by either young or old Ilocanos; Agdamdamili — a pot dance, illustrate in simple steps the ways of the industrious Ilocano; Vintareña — it is a dance performed by one or two couples in social gatherings like baptismal, wedding, birthday, or thanksgiving parties; Kutsara Pasuquiña — it is a dance during birthday parties and festivities; Surtido Norte (Assorted Dances from the North) — this dance is a combination of different Ilocano dance steps manifesting thrift as a trait of the people; Rabong (Bamboo Shoot) — it is a dance glorifying the bamboo shoot as a delicacy of the Ilocanos. In Rabong, the participants sing the lyrics themselves; Kinoton was derived from the Ilocano word “koton” which means ants. This comic dance from the Ilocos region depicts the movements of a person bitten by ants. In social gatherings where close friends and intimates are in attendance, this dance is performed to make people merry. Usually, a male requested to perform this dance.

Pre-Colonial Writing System
The indigenous writing system and script of the Ilocano people is known as kur-itan. There have been proposals to revive the kur-itan script by teaching it in Ilocano-majority public and private schools in Ilocos Norte and Ilocos Sur.

Pre-colonial Ilocano people of all classes wrote in a syllabic system known as baybayin prior to European arrival. They used an abugida, or an alphasyllabary. It was similar to the Tagalog and Pangasinan scripts, where each character represented a consonant-vowel, or CV, sequence. The Ilocano version, however, was the first to designate coda consonants with a diacritic mark – a cross or virama – shown in the Doctrina Cristiana of 1621, one of the earliest surviving Ilocano publications. Before the addition of the virama, writers had no way to designate coda consonants. The reader, on the other hand, had to guess whether a consonant not succeeding a vowel is read or not, for it is not written. Vowel kudlits interchange between e or i, and o or u. Due to this, vowels e and i are interchangeable and letters o and u, for instance tendera and tindira ("shop-assistant").

Traditional attire

Pandilíng & Kimona

The traditional Ilocano dress made from inabel reflects the admirable qualities of the Ilocana – her aura of quiet beauty, appealing shyness, and dignity in her manners. She selected colors expressing her modesty and simplicity. Her typical dress came in a two-piece ensemble – blouse and skirt. The blouse called “kimona” is either plain white or pastel, usually with a cowl neckline. Her full-length skirt called “pandilíng” is cone-shaped with a drawstring around the waist. This is made from hand loom-woven textiles which she herself has meticulously woven and sewn by hand.

The designs of the weave are inspired by things in nature such as diamonds, milkyway, shells and stripes or checkered. The dress is worn over a full slip called kamison. The Sunday dress is more elaborately designed. A colorful wrap-around called tapis is in colors which compliment the pandilíng. The tsinelas are everyday footwear made of leather, while the formal footwear called “kutso” are made of beaded felt and leather which are worn on Sundays and fiestas.

Kattukong or Tabúngaw Hat

The traditional Ilocano headgear or hat “kattukong” or “tabúngaw” are made from a hollowed and dried “calabash gourd” or tabúngaw in Ilocano, Upo in Tagalog also known as bottle gourd or white pumpkin which are part of the Cucurbitaceae family of plants, with a woven interior made of anahaw, “nipa”, “bamboo” or “rattan”. Kattukong is weatherproof and worn as protection against the sun and rain by mannalon (farmers) and mangngalap (fishermen).

This gourd casque is a master's creation that exhibits finest workmanship of National Living Treasure or Manlilikha ng Bayan Teofilo Garcia of San Quintin, Abra who was awarded with the prestigious title. National Living Treasure awardee Teofilo Garcia is the last of the gourd hat makers, involved from the planting of the seeds to the varnishing of the hat. He intends to pass on the knowledge and skills to preserve the practice.

Traditional games 
“Kukudisi” is a uniquely Ilocano game. An an-anak (stick) is placed on a baseline scratched into the ground. One player launches the stick into the air, while the other tries to catch it before it hits the ground. If the latter is unable to do so, a second, longer stick (the in-ina) is placed across the baseline, and the player attempts to hit it with the an-anak. The next two phases of the game involve competing to see who can hit the an-anak (which has been thrown in the air and stuck into the baseline) the farthest with the in-ina.

Abel weaving (panagabel) 

The “inabel” is one of the many prides of the Philippines' Ilocos region. “Abel” is the Ilocano word for weave, and “inabel” refers to any type of woven fabric. However, in the world of weaving, inabel is specifically used to refer to fabrics that are distinctly Ilocano in origin. Cotton is used to make inabel fabric, which can be plain or patterned. The softness, beautiful designs, and strength of abel cloth are well known and much loved.

Ilocos weavers weave on hardwood pedal looms with a variety of design techniques. The dizzying “binakul pattern” is meant to ward off and distract evil spirits, protecting the wearer. The multi-heddle design technique, the “pinilian” or brocade weave, the “suk-suk” or discontinuous supplementary weft technique, and the “ikat” tie-dye technique are some other patterns. Each province has its own design style. The process of creating inabel, like other forms of handweaving in the country, is intricate and labor-intensive. Cat's paws, fans, stars, and windows are popular patterns.

The traditional process of weaving abel cloth begins with preparing the “kapas” or cotton, from picking cotton balls, removing seeds, pounding or beating, twisting using a spindle, and winding the cotton yarn into the skeiner. The skeined yarn is then brushed to make it glossy and durable before it is wound to a bamboo spool. Once the yarn is ready, it’s time to prepare the loom.

The weaver winds the spool yarn into the warping reel. The warp yarn is then wound into the warp beam rod. Next comes heddling, in which the warp yarn is inserted through the eye of the heddle using a weaving hook. After that, the weaver inserts the warp yarn through the spaces of the reed and “dresses” the loom by tying the heddles behind the beater. Only then can agabel, or weaving, commence.

Plain weaves are the most commonly produced inabel, and these are used for everything from hand towels and placemats to blankets and dress material. In Ilocos, it is not uncommon for inabel to be used as material for everyday household items such as curtains, tablecloths, bath towels, table runners, bed linen, bags, and even mosquito nets.

Although the skill is now rare due to a dearth in both practitioners and raw materials, inabel textile products are in high demand in the fashion and interior design industries due to their softness, durability, suitability in tropical climates, and for its austere design patterns.

In Pinili, Ilocos Norte, centuries of history and tradition are best embodied in the hands of 97-year-old Magdalena Gamayo. Magdalena Gamayo, born in 1924, is a master weaver of the inabel cloth, a historical cotton fabric bartered for gold in the Galleon Trade and mentioned in the classic Ilocano epic Biag ni Lam-ang. She has been a mag-aabel for over 80 years, having learned the craft at the age of 15 by watching her aunts work during the Second World War.

Magdalena has since honored her craft on her own, teaching herself traditional inabel patterns like “binakol” (whirlwinds, her specialty), “inuritan” (geometric patterns), “sinan-sabong” (flowers), and “kusikos” (spiral forms). She has also taught herself to recreate patterns even when she does not have a sample to refer to. Her unrivaled command of inabel weaving was recognized in 2012 when she received the GAMABA, or National Living Treasures Award. She is one of only 16 awardees to date.

Burnáy pottery 

A prominent traditional craft of the Ilocano people, particularly in the area of Vigan, is the creation of unglazed earthenware jars locally called “burnáy”. The tradition dates back to before the arrival of European colonizers, when the peoples of northwestern Luzon traded extensively with merchants from China, and since then, become a staple in traditional Filipino kitchens, where they are used to store basic goods such tea drinking, storage for “danum” (water), “bagas” (rice grains) and as container for “asin” (salt), brown “asukar” sugar, “basi” (local wine) a “bugguong” (fermented fish). It is even said basi and bugguong taste much better when stored inside burnáys.

Other crafts
Among the traditional crafts of the Ilocanos are the:

Dadapilan (a tool use for crushing sugarcane)
Tilar(native loom),
Dulang (low table)
Almiris (mortar)
Maguey products (rope, fiber etc.)
Panday (blacksmith),
Sag-ut (cotton yarn).

Notable Ilocanos

Notable Ilocanos
Archbishop Emeritus Edmundo M. Abaya, DD was born on Jan. 19, 1929 in Candon, Ilocos Sur.During his active years in the ministry, Abaya had served as chairman of the CBCP's Commission on Ecumenical and Inter-religious Affairs from 1988 to 1989. The first appointee of the late pope-turned-saint John Paul II as bishop in the Philippines died on September 20, 2018.
Zacarias Agatep (6 September 1936 – 27 October 1982), nicknamed "Apo Kari", was the parish priest of Our Lady of Hope Parish in Caoayan, Ilocos Sur, honored at the Philippines' Bantayog ng mga Bayani for his resistance to the excesses of the Marcos dictatorship. Jailed for four months in 1980 for speaking against foreign and local monopolies in the tobacco industry and released as a publicity stunt before the visit of Pope John Paul II, he decried his arrest as a "frame-up" until he was shot four times in the back by unidentified gunmen in October 1982.
Jeremias Aquino - (1 June 1949 – 14 December 1981) A priest of the Iglesia Filipina Independiente, was the program coordinator and youth director of the Philippine Independent Church's Laoag (Ilocos Norte) diocese, concurrent associate rector of Pagudpud, Ilocos Norte, and director of the Ecumenical Center for Development. Jailed in September 1979 as a political prisoner as a member of the Student Christian Movement of the Philippines and of Christians for National Liberation, famously staged a hunger strike to protest prison conditions until he was released in December 1980 as part of a series of prisoner releases meant to generate positive press prior to the impending visit of Pope John Paul II to Manila in 1981. Established a livelihood center for former political prisoners after being released, but killed in a "suspicious" vehicular accidentin December 1981. Honored at the Philippines' Bantayog ng mga Bayani for protesting the abuses of the Martial Law administration.
Gregorio Aglipay, founder of the Aglipayan Church.
Pedro Almazan, leader from Laoag; proclaimed and crowned King of Ilocos; led the First Ilocos Revolt in January 1661.
Magnolia Antonino (born December 14, 1915) was a Senator of the Philippines. She was married to Gaudencio Antonino, also a Senator.
 Manuel Arguilla (June 17, 1911 – August 30, 1944) was an Ilokano writer, resistance fighter, and martyr. Widely recognized as one of the leading lights of Philippine literature before the outbreak of World War II, he is best remembered for the literary collection How My Brother Leon Brought Home a Wife and Other Short Stories, which won first prize in the Commonwealth Literary Contest in 1940.  He joined the resistance against the Japanese occupation during World War II, and was beheaded among a group of other guerillas at the Manila Chinese Cemetery on August 30, 1944.
Rodolfo "Pong" Gaspar Biazon (born April 14, 1935) is a former General and Chief of Staff of the Armed Forces of the Philippines, Philippine Marines officer, and politician in the Philippines. He was elected Senator in the 1992 election for a term of 3 years. He was elected to his first six-year term in the 1998 election, and was re-elected in the 2004 election. Biazon was born in Batac, Ilocos Norte.
 David Bueno, Filipino human rights lawyer and radio show host from Ilocos Norte during the Marcos Martial Law era. Assassinated during the early part of the succeeding Aquino administration and later honored at the Philippines' Bantayog ng mga Bayani memorial.
Jose Burgos, Filipino priest and martyr during Spanish times.
Sonny Cabatu (born on October 10, 1960) is a semi-retired Filipino professional basketball player in the Philippine Basketball Association and was the very first draft pick of the league in 1985. He is also the father of current Barangay Ginebra Kings player Junjun Cabatu.
Conchita Carpio-Morales, from Paoay, Ilocos Norte, former Ombudsman of the Philippines and Associate Justice of the Supreme Court of the Philippines.
Niña Corpuz, indigenous textiles advocate, businesswoman, and former Filipino journalist from Batac, Ilocos Norte
Marcelino Crisologo, writer, playwright, and first governor of Ilocos Sur
Lilia Cuntapay, Filipina horror actress,
Gloria Diaz, Miss Universe 1969 from Aringay, La Union.
Juan Ponce Enrile, a former senator who served as Senate President from 2008 to 2013. He is from Gonzaga, Cagayan.
Josefa Llanes Escoda, women's rights activist, founder of the Girl Scouts of the Philippines.
Erlinda Fadera-Basilio, ambassador and permanent representative of the Philippines to the United Nations and other international organizations in Geneva, Switzerland; the first woman Vice President of the UN Human Rights Council; founding member of the English Speaking Union (ESU), Philippines Chapter. She is from Bacnotan, La Union.
Leona Florentino, late 1800s poet in Spanish and Ilocano, considered the "mother of Philippine women's literature,"  and recognized as a pioneer in Philippine lesbian literature.
Francisco Sionil José, prominent English-language novelist.
Lucrecia Kasilag (31 August 1918 – 16 August 2008) was a National Artist of the Philippines for Music, as a composer and pianist. Particularly known for incorporating indigenous Filipino instruments into orchestral productions, she is from San Fernando, La Union.
Carlo Lacana, Filipino actor.
Japoy Lizardo, Filipino actor/athlete
General Antonio Luna, general of Emilio Aguinaldo's era.
Juan Luna, famous Filipino painter, older brother of Antonio.
Guji Lorenzana, Filipino actor/singer, 
Antonio Mabutas – Agoo, La Union-born first Bishop of the Diocese of Laoag and the second Archbishop of the Archdiocese of Davao, historically notable as the first Roman Catholic Archbishop to write a pastoral letter to criticize human rights violations under the Marcos dictatorship.
Ernesto Maceda also known as "Manong Ernie" was a Filipino politician, lawyer, and columnist who first gained national prominence in Ferdinand Marcos' cabinet as the Presidential Assistant on Community Development, but resigned in protest upon the declaration of martial law in 1972. He later became as a Senator of the Philippines from 1971 to 1972 and again from 1987 to 1998, servings as Senate President from 1996 to 1998.
Ferdinand Marcos, 10th President of the Philippines, known for amassing wealth and for the human rights abuses under his dictatorship of the country.
Bongbong Marcos is the 17th president of the Philippines and the only son of former president and dictator Ferdinand Marcos. He served as governor of Ilocos Norte from 1998 to 2007. He also served as a representative of Ilocos Norte's 2nd District. He was formerly a Senator of the Philippines.
Maria Imelda Josefa Romualdez Marcos, also known as Imee Marcos, daughter of former president Ferdinand Marcos, is a former representative of the 2nd District of Ilocos Norte in the Philippine House of Representatives (1998 to 2007). She is the governor of Ilocos Norte since 2010. She belongs to the Kilusang Bagong Lipunan political party.
Mariano Marcos, father of Ferdinand Marcos, was a lawyer and a politician.
Martha Vanessa Antonio del Moral (born May 23, 1988), better known by her screen name Vaness del Moral, is a Filipina actress and a talent at one of the top management groups in the Philippines, the GMA Artist Center.
Jimboy Martin, Filipino Actor, He is originally from Nueva Vizcaya.
Bienvenido Nebres, the longest-serving university president of Ateneo de Manila University; member of the board of trustees of Georgetown University, Regis University, the Asian Institute of Management (where he sits as vice-chair), and other colleges and universities in the Philippines.
Jane Oineza, Filipina actress,
Camilo Osías (March 23, 1889 – May 20, 1976) was a Filipino politician, twice for a short time President of the Senate of the Philippines.
Robin Padilla, Filipino actor, from Nueva Ecija.
Armando "Mandrake" Ducusin Palabay – Filipino student leader and activist from San Fernando La Union, honored at the Philippines' Bantayog ng mga Bayani as a martyr of the resistance against the Marcos dictatorship.
Quintín Paredes (September 9, 1884 – January 30, 1973), a Filipino lawyer, politician, and statesman. He was born in Bangued, Abra.
Markus Paterson, Filipino actor,
Elpidio Quirino, 6th President of the Philippines (1948–1953) and native of Caoayan, Ilocos Sur.
Artemio Ricarte (October 20, 1866 – July 31, 1945) was a Filipino general during the Philippine Revolution and the Philippine–American War. He is considered by the Armed Forces of the Philippines as the "Father of the Philippine Army". Ricarte is also notable for never having taken an oath of allegiance to the United States government, which occupied the Philippines from 1898 to 1946. Ricarte was born in Batac, Ilocos Norte.
Jericho Rosales, Filipino actor
Maja Salvador,Filipina actress
Gabriela Silang, wife of Diego, revolutionary.
Luis "Chavit" Singson (born June 21, 1941), better known as Chavit Singson, a Filipino politician from Vigan City. He was a former Governor of the province of Ilocos Sur, Philippines since 1998. He is the owner of the Partas Bus Company. Singson is said to have started EDSA II, when in October 2000 he alleged he gave President Joseph Estrada PHP400 million as payoff from illegal gambling profits.
Jessica Soho (born March 27, 1964) is a Filipino broadcast journalist, documentarian, and news director who received a George Foster Peabody Award and was the first Filipino to win the British Fleet Journalism Award in 1998. She is from San Juan, La Union
Benito Soliven, studied law at the University of the Philippines, graduated summa cum laude, placed third in the 1921 Bar Examinations, the first lawyer of Santo Domingo, Ilocos Sur, an intellectual, a linguist, a successful political leader, an Outstanding Congressman, a three-termer in the House of Representatives acclaimed as "Valedictorian" in congress having the greatest number of bills most of which were passed/approved by his colleagues, a hero of World War II, he helped his needy clients free of charge. He is the father of the late Maximo Villaflor Soliven, a prominent Filipino journalist and newspaper publisher, and realtor Victorio V. Soliven. A school and a town are also named after him, the Benito Soliven Academy, located in Santo Domingo, Ilocos Sur and Benito Soliven in the province of Isabela.
Máximo Villaflor Solivén (September 4, 1929 – November 24, 2006) was a prominent Filipino journalist and newspaper publisher. In a career that spanned six decades, he attained his greatest peak and influence with the Philippine Star, which he co-founded in 1986, and where he served as publisher until his death. His daily column published in the Star, titled "By The Way", was one of the most widely read newspaper columns in the Philippines
Fabian Ver, former General and Chief of the Armed Forces of the Philippines.
Glennifer Perido, beauty pageant titleholder, from Tabuk, Kalinga.
Teófilo Yldefonso, "the Ilocano Shark" (February 9, 1903 – July 19, 1943), was a Filipino swimmer who specialized in the breaststroke. He was the first Filipino to win an Olympic medal, and the only Filipino to win multiple medals. He was born in Piddig, Ilocos Norte.
Nova Villa, Filipino actress.

Ilocano people from Pangasinan

Anne Curtis, Filipina actress whose mother is Ilocano from Pangasinan.
Jasmine Curtis-Smith Filipina actress, younger sister of Anne Curtis.
Jhong Hilario, Filipino actor/host/dancer.
Danny Ildefonso a professional basketball player who played in San Miguel Beerman, now Petron Blaze Boosters who won 8 PBA championships and 2 MVP's and rookie of the year award in 1998. He is fluent in Ilocano. He is from Urdaneta City, Pangasinan.
Marc Pingris, Filipino basketball player,
Fidel V. Ramos, 12th President of the Philippines (1992–1998) from Lingayen, Pangasinan
Carmen Rosales, actress from Pangasinan.
F. Sionil José, novelist.

Ilocano people from Central Luzon 
Gregorio C. Brillantes from Camiling, Tarlac, a multi-award-winning fiction writer and magazine editor, is one of the Philippines' greatest writers in English.
Onofre Corpuz, from Camiling, Tarlac, writer and former secretary of the Department of Education; 13th president of the University of the Philippines; president of the Development Bank of the Philippines.
Ramon Magsaysay, 7th President of the Philippines, from Iba, Zambales.
JB Magsaysay, Pinoy Big Brother (season 1) housemate and grandson of former President Ramon Magsaysay.
Nicanor Reyes Sr., founder and first president of the Far Eastern University in Manila. He envisioned a school that would promote the teaching of accounting to Filipinos, a profession formerly available only to foreigners. His hometown was Paniqui, Tarlac.
Ruby Rodriguez from San Marcelino, Zambales is a Filipina actress and a co-host of the television variety show Eat Bulaga! in the Philippines.
Paulino Santos, from Camiling, Tarlac, a former chief of staff of the Philippine Army during the time of Philippine President Manuel Luis Quezon; founder of Penal Colonies and a Philippine Constabulary Second Lieutenant.

Other notable Filipinos of Ilocano ancestry
Alden Richards actor whose his paternal grandmother is Ilokana from Sinait, Ilocos Sur
Alma Moreno, Filipina actress born in Cervantes, Ilocos Sur. 
Antonio Carpio, Associate Justice, Ilocano father
Bela Padilla, actress whose is from Nueva Ecija
Bianca King, Filipina actress, her mother is Ilokana.
Bryan Termulo, singer whose mother is Ilocana from La Union
Carlos P. Garcia, 8th President of the Philippines (1957–1961), his parents were natives from Bangued, Abra.
Ces Drilon, Filipina news anchor, Her father is Ilocano.
Coleen Garcia, Filipina actress, her mother is Ilokana from La Union.
Darren Espanto, Filipino singer, His parents are Ilocano From Nueva Vizcaya.
Daniel Padilla actor whose paternal grandmother is Ilokana and the sister of Bela Padilla's maternal grandmother.
Doug Kramer, Filipino basketball player. His mother is from La Union.
Gloria Macapagal-Arroyo, daughter of Eva Macapagal from Pangasinan.
Isabelle Daza, daughter of Gloria Diaz.
Joseph Emilio Abaya DOTC secretary. His father, Cong. Plaridel Abaya hails from Candon, Ilocos Sur. He is a descendant of Isabelo Abaya of Candon, Ilocos Sur, "one of the greatest heroes of the Revolution in the entire North".
Jessie Mendiola Filipina actress, whose mother Didith Garvida hails from Bangui, Ilocos Norte.
Jonha Richman, Filipino-businesswoman whose mother is from Bangued, Abra. 
Kylie Padilla, Filipina actress. Her father, Robin Padilla, is an Ilocano from Nueva Ecija. 
Marilou Diaz-Abaya, Filipina director and National Artist of the Philippines for Film and Broadcast Arts; her father is from Paoay, Ilocos Norte.
Jim Paredes, musician whose his father is Ilocano from Abra
Liza Soberano, Filipino-American model and actress. Her father and ancestors are Ilocanos from Sta. Maria, Asingan, and Baguio.
Mac Alejandre, Filipino director.
Vice Ganda, also known as Jose Mari Viceral, a Filipino comedian. His mother is Ilokana from La Union.
Yassi Pressman, actress whose mother is from Isabela.

Foreign nationals of Ilocano ancestry
Pedro Flores, businessman and toymaker who has been credited with popularizing Yo-yos in the United States.
John Leo Dato, Filipino-American boxer
Matthew Libatique, an American Hollywood cinematographer and Oscar nominee, best known for his work with director Darren Aronofsky on such films as A Star is Born, Iron Man 1 and Iron Man 2, Inside Man, Miracle at St. Anna, Gothika, Cowboys & Aliens, π, Requiem for a Dream, The Fountain and Black Swan
Jasmine Trias, 3rd-place winner in American Idol Season 3.
Jocelyn Enriquez, singer in the Dance Music Genre who did the hit songs A Little Bit Of Ectasy and Do You Miss Me.
Benny Agbayani, professional baseball player.
Larry Ramos (born Hilario Ramos on April 19, 1942), professional guitar player and singer who was awarded a Grammy for his participation in the 1962 album, Presenting The New Christy Minstrels, and who was a key part of the 1960s American pop band the Association.
Thelma Buchholdt, J.D., elected member, Alaska State House of Representatives (1974–1982).
Carlos Bulosan, Binalonan, Pangasinan-born novelist and poet best-known today for his novel America Is in the Heart
David Bunevacz, athlete.
Mikey Bustos, YouTube star and Canadian Idol finalist.
Ben Cayetano, 5th Governor of Hawaii (1994–2002).
Philip Vera Cruz, labor union leader.
Emil Guillermo, journalist and 2000 American Book Award winner.
Gina Ortiz Jones, Filipina-American Iraq War veteran, intelligence officer and politician.
Ana "The Hurricane" Julaton (from Pozorrubio, Pangasinan) is a boxer. She won the San Francisco Golden Gloves, the California State Championships, was a Diamond Belt champion and closed out her amateur career by winning the silver medal in the United States Amateur Championships. As a professional boxer, Julation is close to the top in winning world titles with the fewest professional bouts. , she is a world-title holder of the International Boxing Association and the World Boxing Organization.
Lt. Gen. Edward Soriano, first Filipino American General of the US Army (ret).
Maj. Gen. Antonio Taguba, second Fil-Am General of the US Army.
Brian Viloria, light flyweight boxing champion.
PJ Raval, Fil-Am filmmaker and director of the feature documentary Call Her Ganda about the murder of Jennifer Laude by US Marine Joseph Scott Pemberton.
Bretman Rock, a YouTube star, his parents were from Cagayan Valley, and now currently living in Hawaii.
Vincent Bueno, Austrian singer who represented Austria in the 65th Eurovision song contest.

See also
Ethnic groups in the Philippines

Notes and sources

References

External links

The Online Ilokano Dictionary Project – A free Ilokano dictionary application. The primary objective of TOIDP is to provide an online Ilokano resource for people to utilize so that they may overcome the language barriers existing between the English and Ilokano languages. Feel free to browse around and make full use of the tools available on this site.
Tarabay iti Ortograpia ti Pagsasao nga Ilokano – A free ebook version of the Guide on the Orthography of the Ilokano Language developed by the Komisyon ng Wikang Filipino (KWF) in consultation with various stakeholders in Ilokano language and culture. Developed back in 2012 as a resource material for the implementation of the Department of Education's K-12 curriculum with the integration of MTB-MLE or Mother Tongue-Based Multilingual Education.
 Most Popular Ilocano Website
 World's Most Famous Ilocanos
 Ilocano: Ti Pagsasao ti Amianan
 NAKEM Centennial Conference
 Tawid News Magasin Ilokano News and Literature Portal
dadapilan.com – Iloko literature portal featuring original Iloko works by Ilokano writers and a forum for Iloko literary study, criticism, and online workshop.
 Ilocano.org – An online community for Ilocanos.
 IlocanoPride
Learn Filipino A webpage to learn how people are called in Ilocano

 
Ilocano culture
Ethnic groups in Luzon
Ethnic groups in the Philippines